Clint Dolezel (born March 25, 1970) is an American football coach and former professional arena football player in the Arena Football League (AFL).

Dolezel was a quarterback in the AFL before becoming the head coach of the AFL's Philadelphia Soul from 2013 until the league folded in 2019. He played college football at East Texas State, and was in the AFL for 13 seasons from 1995 to 2008. Dolezel first became a head coach in 2010 with the San Angelo Stampede Express of the Indoor Football League (IFL). After just a single season, Dolezel returned to the AFL as the head coach of the Dallas Vigilantes. After the Vigilantes franchise suspended operations, Dolezel joined the Philadelphia Soul as their offensive coordinator under head coach Doug Plank. Plank left the Soul following the 2012 season, and the Soul promoted Dolezel to head coach. He was named the inaugural head coach of the Frisco Fighters in the Indoor Football League before the 2020 season. On December 7, 2022, it was announced that Dolezel would return to his alma mater, Texas A&M University–Commerce, to serve as the school's head football coach. 

As an AFL player, he was originally signed by the Milwaukee Mustangs. In his career, he also played for the Texas Terror/Houston Thunderbears, Grand Rapids Rampage, Las Vegas Gladiators, and the Dallas Desperados. Dolezel was also a scout for the Dallas Cowboys 2007.

Early life
Born in Waco, Texas, to Johnnie and Judy Dolezel, Clint attended Robinson High School in Robinson, Texas, where he was a standout quarterback and golfer.

College career
After graduating from Robinson, Dolezel attended Cisco College and was a student and a letterman in football. In football, he was a second-team All-Conference selection as a sophomore. After graduating from Cisco, he committed to the University of Southern Mississippi. However, a coaching change landed Dolezel at East Texas State University to play for coach Eddie Vowell. Dolezel was a letterman in football, golf, and track and field at East Texas State, becoming one of just three documented three-sport athletes in the history of the university. He quarterbacked the Lions in 1992 and 1993 and ended his career as a Lion throwing for 3,152 yards and 23 touchdowns over 2 seasons. The Lions finished 8-2 during his junior year and finished second in the Lone Star Conference.

Professional career
After establishing himself as one of the best young quarterbacks in the AFL, Dolezel signed with the Chicago Bears in 2000.

Dolezel, along with wide receiver Terrill Shaw, helped the Grand Rapids Rampage win the 2001 ArenaBowl. Dolezel and Shaw became teammates again playing for the Dallas Desperados in 2006.

In September 2003, the Rampage traded Dolezel to the Las Vegas Gladiators for Sedrick Robinson, Paul LaQuerre and Hardy Mitchell.

On March 12, 2006, Dolezel threw his 700th career touchdown, becoming just the third quarterback in AFL history to do so. The Desperados won that game versus the Tampa Bay Storm 64–35.

On April 16, 2007, in a 51–41 home win against the Philadelphia Soul, Dolezel became the first professional quarterback to throw 800 touchdown passes. In 2007, Dolezel became the first quarterback in league history to lead his team to 15 wins in a season. Despite the 15–1 record, Dallas lost to the 7–9 Columbus Destroyers in the first round of the playoffs. In a 2008 game versus the Grand Rapids Rampage, Dolezel became the first quarterback in league history to throw for 900 touchdown passes in a career.

Statistics

Stats from ArenaFan:

Coaching career
Dolezel had said that he would like to be a coach after his career is over. It was announced that on January 19, Dolezel would become the offensive coordinator for the Florida Firecats' 2009 season (due to the Arena Football League suspending operations for 2009). He was the head coach of the San Angelo Stampede Express of the Indoor Football League in 2010.

Dolezel was announced as the head coach for the Dallas Vigilantes for the 2011 season. The team did not play in 2012 for unknown reasons.

On August 21, 2012, Dolezel was promoted from offensive coordinator to head coach of the Philadelphia Soul.

On September 16, 2014, Dolezel re-signed with the Soul for two more seasons.

In June 2016, Dolezel was announced as the first head coach of the China Arena Football League's Beijing Lions. He was named an All-Pro North Division All-Star as a head coach. On November 6, 2016, the Lions won the first China Bowl and finished the season undefeated.

On August 25, 2016, Dolezel was named the 2016 Marcum-Moss Head Coach of the Year. A day later, he won his first ArenaBowl championship as a coach when the Soul defeated the Arizona Rattlers, 56–42, in ArenaBowl XXIX in Glendale, Arizona.

On August 26, 2017, the Soul beat the Tampa Bay Storm in ArenaBowl XXX by a score of 44–40.

In 2019, the AFL folded and Dolezel was hired as the inaugural head coach of the Frisco Fighters in the Indoor Football League before the 2020 season. However, the 2020 season was cancelled due to the onset of the COVID-19 pandemic. He returned to Frisco for the 2021 season, leading the team to a 10–3 record and made it to the league semifinal. Near the end 2021 season, Dolezel was signed to a multi-year extension, but ultimately chose to leave the team to pursue other opportunities.

Dolezel served as a quarterback coach consultant for Zachary Levi in preparation for the 2021 film, American Underdog: The Kurt Warner Story. Levi starred as Kurt Warner, the Super Bowl champion and Hall of Fame NFL quarterback, in the film. Dolezel assisted in training Levi with mechanics, physical training and throwing. Dolezel played against Warner when the duo played in the Arena Football League.

Dolezel was named the 21st head coach in the history of the football program at Texas A&M University-Commerce, his alma mater, on December 7, 2022. He became just the third alum to take the reigns of the Lion football program, and the first since 1930.

Head coaching record

References

External links

 Texas A&M–Commerce profile
 Clint Dolezel on ArenaFan.com

1970 births
Living people
American football quarterbacks
China Arena Football League coaches
Cisco Wranglers football players
Dallas Cowboys scouts
Dallas Desperados players
Dallas Vigilantes coaches
Grand Rapids Rampage players
Florida Firecats coaches
Las Vegas Gladiators players
Houston ThunderBears players
Milwaukee Mustangs (1994–2001) players
Philadelphia Soul coaches
Texas A&M–Commerce Lions football coaches
Texas A&M–Commerce Lions football players
Texas Terror players
Indoor Football League coaches
Sportspeople from Waco, Texas
Coaches of American football from Texas
Players of American football from Texas